Vili Sopanen (born October 21, 1987) is a Finnish former professional ice hockey player. He last played for Lukko in the Liiga. He was drafted by the New Jersey Devils, 177th overall, in the 2007 NHL Entry Draft. Sopanen has previously played in the top tier Finnish Liiga with Lahti Pelicans, JYP Jyväskylä and HIFK.

Playing career
On June 11, 2018, Sopanen left his native Finland for the second time through his 12 year professional career, agreeing to a one-year deal with German outfit, ERC Ingolstadt of the DEL. During the 2018–19 season, Sopanen played in 14 games with Ingolstadt before transferring to Schwenninger Wild Wings. Sopanen played a further 17 games for 7 points in the DEL before leaving to return to his native Finland, agreeing to an optional three-year deal with Lukko of the Liiga on February 3, 2019.

References

External links

1987 births
Living people
People from Valkeala
HIFK (ice hockey) players
ERC Ingolstadt players
JYP Jyväskylä players
Lahti Pelicans players
Lukko players
Luleå HF players
New Jersey Devils draft picks
Schwenninger Wild Wings players
Finnish ice hockey right wingers
Sportspeople from Kymenlaakso